Lester Daniel Lowther (November 10, 1892 – February 21, 1974) was a Canadian professional ice hockey player. He played with the Toronto Blueshirts of the National Hockey Association.

References

1892 births
1974 deaths
Canadian ice hockey centres
Ice hockey people from Nova Scotia
People from Amherst, Nova Scotia
Toronto Blueshirts players